Baytu  is a tehsil in Barmer district of Rajasthan state of India. It is a tehsil headquarters. It is also spelled as Bayatu, Baitu or Baytoo.

There are four villages with the same name nearby Bayatu Bhimji, Bayatu Chimanji, Bayatu Panji and Baytoo Bhopji. Chiriya

According to the 2001 Census of India, population of the Baytu Bhopji is 2,539, with a male population of 1,322 and female population of 1,217.

References

External links
 Baytoo Geographical details

Villages in Barmer district
Tehsils of Barmer district
Cities and towns in Barmer district